Canadian Forces Fire and Emergency Services provide fire and emergency services to Canadian Forces land bases in Canada where local services are not available or sufficient.

Some bases also require airport fire fighting capabilities, especially those in air bases.

Personnel
Military firefighters in the Canadian Forces are non-commissioned members, and are required to undergo basic training. After basic training they will go to the Canadian Forces Fire Academy in Borden.  From there members will be posted to a military base.

The military firefighters are supplemented by civilian Department of National Defence firefighters on many bases. As of 2011, there were approximately 570 military firefighters and 500 civilians. Military firefighters were deployed as part of Canadian military operations in Afghanistan and the response to the 2010 Haiti earthquake.

Ranks
 Fire Chief - Captain/Master Warrant Officer 
 Deputy Fire Chief - Master Warrant Officer 
 Chief Fire Inspector - Sergeant 
 Inspector - Master corporal or Corporal 
 Platoon Chief - Warrant Officer
 Deputy Platoon Chief - Sergeant  
 Crew Chief - Master corporal
 Firefighter - Private or Corporal

Operations
Following is a list of some of the CFBs with fire and EMS services:
 CFS Alert - Military (Only on tasking) 
 3 Wing Bagotville - Military
 CFB Borden - DND Civilian
 4 Wing Cold Lake - Military
 19 Wing Comox - Military
 CFD Dundurn - Composite
 9 Wing Gander - Military (Fire Inspector Position)
 14 Wing Greenwood - Military
 Edmonton Garrison - Military/ DND Civilian
 CFB Esquimalt - DND Civilian
 5th Canadian Division Support Base (5 CDSB) Gagetown - DND Civilian
 5 Wing Goosebay - Contracted to Serco Canada Inc.
 14 Wing Greenwood - Military
 CFB Halifax - DND Civilian
 4th Canadian Division Training Centre Meaford -  DND Civilian
 NFTC 15 Wing Moose Jaw - Contracted to ATCO Frontec
 Garrison Petawawa - DND Civilian
 12 Wing Shearwater - Military
 CFB Suffield - DND Civilian
 8 Wing Trenton - Military
 2 Canadian Division Support Base (2 CDSB) Valcartier - DND Civilian
 ASU Wainwright - DND Civilian
 17 Wing Winnipeg - Military

CFB Kingston and CFB North Bay once had their own fire services, but now receive fire protection from the Kingston and North Bay municipal fire departments respectively.

Training

Canadian Forces Fire and CBRN Academy
Training for CF firefighters takes places at the Canadian Forces Fire and CBRN Academy (CFFCA) at CFB Borden for a period of 6 months. The CFFCA is mandated and internationally accredited in the delivery of Fire Service Curriculum in the areas of Fire Prevention, Aircraft Rescue Fire Fighting, Structural Fire Fighting, Fire investigation, Rescue and Respiratory Protection Programme Administration.

Equipment
The Canadian Forces uses a mix of airport and structural fire apparatus. Current equipment includes aircraft rescue and firefighting apparatus built by E-One and structural fire apparatus with custom Spartan Motors chassis and bodies by Fort Garry Fire Trucks. Additional structural pumpers were purchased through a 2014 contract with E-One. Bodywork for rescue trucks and range (brush) trucks were also supplied by Fort Garry. Other apparatus providers include the American branch of Rosenbauer (aerial platforms) and KME (aircraft rescue and firefighting).

See also
 List of fire departments

References

 
 
 
 

Canadian Armed Forces
Fire departments of Canada
Military specialisms
Canadian Military Engineers
Military fire departments
Aircraft rescue and firefighting